The Reno Air Races, officially known as the STIHL National Championship Air Races from 2016, is a multi-day event tailored to the aviation community that takes place each September at the Reno Stead Airport a few miles north of Reno, Nevada.  Air racing is billed as "the world's fastest motor sport" and Reno is one of the few remaining venues. The event includes races in six classes and demonstrations by airshow pilots.

History

The chief organizer is the Reno Air Racing Association (RARA).

The first Reno air races, in 1964 and 1965, were organized by World War II veteran Bill Stead. After Stead Air Force Base (20 miles to the west, and named in honor of Bill's brother, Croston Stead) was closed in 1966, that field was turned over for public use, and the races have been held there since then.

Aircraft in the Unlimited class, which consists almost entirely of modified and stock World War II fighters, routinely reach speeds in excess of 400 miles per hour. In 2003, Skip Holm piloted Terry Bland's modified P-51D Mustang, Dago Red, and reached an all-time Unlimited class speed record of 507.105 mph in a six-lap race around the -mile course. The recently added Sport Class racers, mostly homebuilt aircraft, are reaching speeds in excess of 400 mph. In 2009, Curt Brown set a record of 543.568 mph in his jet-engine L-29 Viper.

The Reno Air Races include two and a half days of qualifying, followed by four and a half days of multi-aircraft heat racing, culminating in the Unlimited Class Gold Race on Sunday afternoon. The event also features civil airshow acts and military flight demonstrations between races, plus vendor areas and a large civil and military static aircraft display.

The COVID-19 pandemic in 2020 caused the 57th annual race to be cancelled and deferred to 2021. In 2001 the remainder of the event was cancelled because of the grounding of US aviation following the attacks on 11 September.

The 2023 air races will be the last ones held in Reno.

Classes
Unlimited
T-6
Biplane
Formula One
Sport
Jet

Significant participants

People

Lee Behel
Robert Lee "Hoot" Gibson
Darryl Greenamyer
Steve Hinton
Steven Hinton, Jr.
Skip Holm
Bob Hoover
Gary Hubler
Rod Lewis
Doug Matthews
Thom Richard
Bill "Tiger" Destefani
Clay Lacy
Pete Zaccagnino
Pete "Tool" Stavrides

Aircraft
Dreadnought
232 September Fury
Dago Red
The Galloping Ghost
Nemesis
Nemesis NXT
Precious Metal
Rare Bear
Red Baron
Tsunami
Voodoo
Strega
Vampire

Fatalities

Before 2011
From 1964 through 2010, 19 aviators lost their lives due to crashes and collisions in the course of the competition and airshow. In 2007, three pilots died over the course of four days in separate incidents: Gary Hubler, Steve Dari, and Brad Morehouse. Racing was suspended for one day after the last of the three incidents.

2011 crash

On September 16, 2011, a heavily modified P-51D Mustang named "The Galloping Ghost," piloted by Jimmy Leeward, crashed near the stands during the Gold Heat of the race, killing Leeward and ten spectators, and injuring 69. Race organizers cancelled all remaining 2011 races after the accident.

2014
A custom built race plane named "Sweet Dreams" crashed on the course during qualifying for a Sport Class heat race on September 8, 2014, killing the pilot, Lee Behel.

2022
In the third lap of the Jet Gold final race on September 18, 2022 an L-29 Super Delfin went down on the back section of the course after presumed G-LOC, killing the pilot Aaron Hogue.

References

External links

Reno Air Racing Association
Reno Air Race results, 1964-present
International Formula One Air Racing
50 Years of Air Racing
1965 Sky Ranch Documentary

Air races
Festivals in Nevada
Sports in Reno, Nevada
Articles containing video clips
Recurring sporting events established in 1964